Bumper Crop is an album by Volcano Suns, released in 1987.

Track listing
The vinyl LP featured these 11 tracks.

The cassette and CD added this bonus track.

The CD also contained a second bonus track.

Personnel 

Sean Slade & Volcano Suns – producer
Peter Prescott – drums, vocals
Bob Weston – bass
Chuck Hahn – guitar, background vocals

References 

1987 albums
Volcano Suns albums